The Oman International Rally (known originally as the Rally Oman, is an international rally racing event held to the south and south-east of the Omani capital of Muscat. The rally is run by the Oman Automobile Association.

The rally, first held in 1979, held on gravel roads and sand for the most part, has consistently been part of the Middle East Rally Championship (MERC) and the Gulf Rally Challenge that preceded it, as well as being a mainstay of the Oman Rally Championship. The first two events were won by Swedish driver Harry Källström before Qatari driver Saeed Al-Hajri became the first Arabian driver to win in 1981. After the rallies most recent interruption it was re-introduced as a round of the Omani championship in 2013 with MERC candidate status following in 2014. The rally rejoined the MERC officially in 2015.

Emirati driver Mohammed bin Sulayem is the most successful driver in the events history having won the event six times between 1986 and 1998. Qatari driver Nasser Al-Attiyah won four consecutive rallies from 2003 to 2006.

List of previous winners
List of winners sourced in part from:

External links

Official website

References

Motorsport competitions in Oman
Rally competitions in Oman
Recurring sporting events established in 1979
Oman
1979 establishments in Oman